Brock Webster (born 21 August 2000) is a Canadian professional rugby union player for Pacific Pride in the Coastal Cup.

Webster won his first cap for Canada in the 2023 Rugby World Cup Qualifier versus the USA, scoring on his debut. He also plays for the Toronto Arrows in Major League Rugby (MLR).

Webster previously played for Canada u20s & for Canada Sevens. In 2022, He competed for Canada at the Rugby World Cup Sevens in Cape Town.

References

2000 births
Living people
Canadian rugby union players
Canada international rugby union players
Rugby union fly-halves
Rugby union wings
Rugby union fullbacks
Toronto Arrows players
People from Uxbridge, Ontario
21st-century Canadian people
Rugby sevens players at the 2022 Commonwealth Games